George Edward John Mowbray Rous, 3rd Earl of Stradbroke,  (19 November 1862 – 20 December 1947) was a British nobleman from Suffolk who served as a Territorial Army officer, as a junior government minister, and as the 15th Governor of Victoria, Australia.

Early years
He was born on 19 November 1862, the only son and heir of John Rous, 2nd Earl of Stradbroke. Under the courtesy title of Viscount Dunwich, he was educated at Harrow School and at Trinity College, Cambridge (Bachelor of Arts 1884, Master of Arts 1890). He succeeded his father as the 3rd Earl of Stradbroke and owner of the family seat at Henham Park in Suffolk on 27 January 1886.

Military career
Viscount Dunwich was commissioned captain in the 1st Norfolk Artillery Volunteers (which included Suffolk batteries) in 1882. He was promoted major in 1884, and lieutenant colonel to command the unit in 1888. He was promoted to colonel in the Volunteers on 26 June 1902, and was awarded the Volunteer Decoration on 15 August 1902. He was appointed an aide-de-camp to King Edward VII in the 1902 Coronation Honours list on 26 June 1902, serving until the King's death in 1910 when he was re-appointed by King George V.

When the Volunteer Force was replaced by the Territorial Force on 1 April 1908, his unit was split up: Stradbroke became Honorary Colonel of the 1st East Anglian Brigade, Royal Field Artillery (TF) (which contained the Norfolk batteries), while remaining lieutenant colonel commanding the 3rd East Anglian (Howitzer) Brigade (which contained the Suffolk batteries). He led the 3rd East Anglian Brigade and its successor units on active service on the Western Front in Egypt and Palestine during the First World War. He was awarded the Territorial Decoration, appointed a Commander of the Order of the British Empire in 1919 and a Knight Commander of the Order of St Michael and St George in 1920.

After the war he remained Honorary Colonel of the Norfolk artillery brigade (now known as the 84th (East Anglian) Brigade) and from 18 May 1927 filled the same role with the Suffolk brigade (now the 103rd Suffolk Brigade) until it was split up, when he continued as Honorary Colonel of the 409th (Suffolk) Independent Anti-Aircraft Battery until its renewed merger with the Norfolk batteries to form the 78th (1st Anglian) Anti-Aircraft Regiment in 1938.

He also served as chairman of the Suffolk Territorial Army Association and as president of the Council of the National Artillery Association. He finally retired from an active role with the Territorial Army and as ADC to the King in 1930.

Politics
Stradbroke was appointed as Governor of Victoria in 1920 and held the position until 1926. He also served as Parliamentary Secretary to the Ministry of Agriculture and Fisheries from 1928 until the defeat of the 1924–1929 Conservative Government.

Scouting
As ex. officio the Chief Scout of Victoria as governor, Lord Stradbroke also sponsored the Victorian Scouting competition, the Stradbroke Cup. This event is still held every year and is immensely popular.

Freemasonry
A Freemason, Stradbroke was initiated to the craft in the Lodge of Prudence No. 388. After he became Worshipful Master of the Lodge, he was appointed Provincial Grand Master of Suffolk in October 1902, holding the position for forty-five years. Two years after being appointed Governor of Victoria, he was elected Grand Master of the Grand Lodge of Victoria. He was also Provincial Grand Master of Mark Masons of East Anglia.

Public life
In addition to his political and military positions, Stradbroke held the office of Vice-Admiral of Suffolk, was Lord Lieutenant of Suffolk and a Justice of the Peace, and an Alderman and chairman of East Suffolk County Council. He was also president of the National Sea Fisheries Protection Association.

Both the Earl and Countess were supporters of thoroughbred racing. While in Victoria they separately owned or leased several horses, notably Trice, trained for the Countess by Jack Holt.

Family
Helena Violet Alice Fraser (died 14 April 1949), daughter of Lieutenant General James Keith Fraser, married Stradbroke on 23 July 1898. As Countess of Stradbroke she was created a Dame Commander of the Order of the British Empire in 1927. They had the following children:

Lady Pleasance Elizabeth Rous (born 11 May 1899 – died 1 September 1986)
Lady Catherine Charlotte Rous (born 5 May 1900 – died 19 September 1983)
Lady Betty Helena Joanna Rous (24 April 1901 – 4 November 1969)
John Anthony Alexander Rous, 4th Earl of Stradbroke (1 April 1903 – 1983)
William Keith Rous, 5th Earl of Stradbroke (10 March 1907 – 1983)
Major Hon. George Nathaniel Rous (5 April 1911 – 1982)
Major Hon. Peter James Mowbray Rous (23 January 1914 – 17 May 1997), married Elizabeth Alice Mary Fraser on 24 June 1942 and had issue
Hon. Christopher Simon Rous (3 January 1916 – 22 February 1925)

Death
The 3rd Earl of Stradbroke died on 20 December 1947 and was succeeded by his eldest son. His widow, the Dowager Countess of Stradbroke, died in an accident on 14 April 1949.

Honours
In addition to the honours noted above, the Earl of Stradbroke was made a Companion of the Order of the Bath in 1904 and a Commander of the Royal Victorian Order in 1906. He was a Knight of the Order of St John and held the Grand Cross of the Order of the Savior of Greece.

References

1862 births
1947 deaths
Alumni of Trinity College, Cambridge
Royal Artillery officers
Commanders of the Order of the British Empire
Commanders of the Royal Victorian Order
Companions of the Order of the Bath
Earls in the Peerage of the United Kingdom
Knights Commander of the Order of St Michael and St George
Governors of Victoria (Australia)
Lord-Lieutenants of Suffolk
Members of East Suffolk County Council
People from Blythburgh
British Army personnel of World War I
Australian Freemasons
Masonic Grand Masters
People educated at Harrow School
Military personnel from London